Stanton Elliot Parris, BSS (22 August 1930 – 5 January 2009) was a West Indian Test cricket umpire. Parris officiated in five Tests and one ODI between 1974 and 1983. His first-class career carried through to 1990. He was an honorary life member of the Barbados Cricket Association. He was awarded the Barbados Service Star in the 2008 Independence Day honours list. Parris died 5 January 2009 in Barbados.

See also
 List of Test cricket umpires
 List of One Day International cricket umpires

References

External links
Cricinfo Profile
List of Test matches umpired by Parris
Details of ODI umpired by Parris

1930 births
2009 deaths
Barbadian cricket umpires
West Indian Test cricket umpires
West Indian One Day International cricket umpires